Richard Graham Collins (born 2 March 1962) is a former international Wales rugby union player. Originally a police officer, he started playing club rugby for South Wales Police RFC, and later Newport RFC, Cardiff RFC, Pontypridd RFC (he also coached the team in 2000)  and Bristol. He was also a Wales international basketball player.

References

External links
Pontypridd RFC profile

1962 births
South Wales Police officers
Living people
Barbarian F.C. players
Bristol Bears players
Cardiff RFC players
Newport RFC players
Rugby union players from Cardiff
Pontypridd RFC players
Wales international rugby union players
Welsh police officers
Welsh rugby union coaches
Welsh rugby union players
South Wales Police RFC players
Rugby union flankers